Earthquake McGoon may refer to:

 Earthquake McGoon, a fictional character in the Li'l Abner comic strip
 Earthquake McGoon, nickname of American pilot James B. McGovern Jr. (1922–1954)
 Earthquake McGoon, Thoroughbred winner of the 1979 The Metropolitan horse race
 Earthquake McGoon's, a Dixieland jazz nightclub owned by Turk Murphy (1915–1987)
 Live at Earthquake McGoon's, a 1961 album by Turk Murphy and Ernie Carson (1937–2012)
 Live at Earthquake McGoon's, a 1966 album by Clancy Hayes (1908–1972)
 Live at Earthquake McGoon's, a 1970 album by Firehouse Five Plus Two
 The Earthquake McGoon Recordings, a 1973 album by Turk Murphy
 Earthquake McGoon's Brain Rattler, a rollercoaster at Dogpatch USA built by Chance Rides
 Several Boeing B-17 Flying Fortress heavy bombers during World War II; see Sir Baboon McGoon